Pleasure Palace is a 1980 television movie.

Plot
A high stakes womanizer and gambler agrees to help a female casino owner. We are led to believe that Principal's character is a glamorous jewel thief. A successful gambler, known internationally for his romantic conquests, finds his reputation at stake.

Cast
Omar Sharif as Louis Lefevre
Victoria Principal as Patti
Hope Lange as Madelaine Calvert
Jose Ferrer as Andre "Pokey" Poquette
Gerald S. O'Loughlin as Benny Moffo
Teddi Siddall as Bobby
John Fujioka as Ito
Alexander Zale as Hussein
Joe Bernard as Starkey

Production
The film was shot in Las Vegas.

Reception
The New York Times called it "not a great trash movie, but it deserves a B+ for trying".

References

External links
Pleasure Palace at IMDb
Pleasure Palace at TCMDB

1980 television films
1980 films
American television films
Films directed by Walter Grauman